Jiaodaokou Subdistrict is a subdistrict in Dongcheng District, Beijing, China. It contains 7 communities within 1.57 km2 of land, as of 2020 it has a permanent population of 31,951.

The subdistrict was named after the Jiaodaokounan Avenue that is located in it.

History

Administrative Divisions 
As of 2021, there are seven communities within the subdistrict:

Famous Site 

 Nanluogu Alley

See also 
List of township-level divisions of Beijing

References

Dongcheng District, Beijing
Subdistricts of Beijing